The 2005–06 Ohio State Buckeyes men's basketball team represented Ohio State University in the 2005–06 NCAA Division I men's basketball season. They were led by their second-year head coach, Thad Matta, and played their home game at the Value City Arena, in Columbus, Ohio as members of the Big Ten Conference. The Buckeyes finished the season 26–6, 12–4 in Big Ten play to win the regular season championship. As the No. 1 seed in the Big Ten tournament, they defeated Penn State and Indiana before losing to Iowa in the championship game. They received an at-large bid to the NCAA tournament as a No. 2 seed in the Minneapolis regional. There they defeated Davidson in the first round before being upset by Georgetown in the second round.

Previous season 
The Buckeyes finished the 2004–05 season 20–12, 8–8 in Big Ten play to finish in sixth place. They beat Penn State in the Big Ten tournament before losing to Wisconsin in the quarterfinals.

Roster

Starting lineup

Schedule and results

|-
!colspan=9 style=| Regular season

|-
!colspan=9 style=|Big Ten tournament

|- 
!colspan=9 style=|NCAA tournament

References 

Ohio State Buckeyes
Ohio State
Ohio State Buckeyes men's basketball seasons
Ohio State Buckeyes
Ohio State Buckeyes